Hakim or Al-Hakim (commonly  "wise" or  "ruler") is a masculine given name.  Its Anglicized variant, especially in the United States, is Hakeem.

Title

 Samir Geagea, known as al-Hakim, leader of the Lebanese Forces party
 George Habash, known as al-Hakim, founder of the Popular Front for the Liberation of Palestine

Honorific
 Hakim Noor-ud-Din
 Hakim Abdul Aziz
 Hakim Habibur Rahman
 Hakim Mohammed Said
 Hakim Syed Karam Husain
 Hakim Syed Zillur Rahman

Patronymic
 Abu Abdullah al-Hakim Nishapuri (933–1012), Sunni scholar and traditionist of Khorasan
 Abdel-Aziz al-Hakim (1953–2009), Iraqi cleric and politician
 Sulayman ibn al-Hakam (died 1016), Umayyad ruler of Córdoba
 Tawfiq al-Hakim (1898–1987), Egyptian dramatist, novelist and thinker

Given name
 Al-Hakim al-Tirmidhi (c. 755 – 869), Sunni jurist and traditionist of Khorasan
 Al-Hakim bi-Amr Allah (985–1021), Fatimid caliph (r. 996–1021)
 Hakim (Egyptian singer) (born 1962), Egyptian sha'abi singer
 Al-Hakam I (died 822), Emir of Córdoba
 Al-Hakam II (915–976), Ruler of Córdoba
 Hakeem Adeniji (born 1997), American football player
 Hakim Adi (living), British historian and scholar
 Al-Hakam ibn Abi al-'As (c. 600), father of Umayyad caliph Marwan I and uncle of Uthman ibn Affan
 Hakim Bey, pseudonym of Peter Lamborn Wilson (born 1945), American writer
 Abdul Hakim Sani Brown (born 1999), Japanese runner of sprint
 Hakim ibn Hizam (fl. 600s), Meccan merchant
 Hakeem Jeffries (born 1970), American Congressman
 Hakeem Nicks, (born 1988), American football player
 Hakeem Noor-ud-Din (c. 1841 – 1914), Ahmadiyya leader and companion of Mirza Ghulam Ahmad
 Hakeem Femi Gbajabiamila (born 1962), Nigerian politician
 Hakeem Olajuwon (born 1963), Nigerian-American retired basketball player
 Hakim Rawther (died 2013), Indian director and actor of Malayalam films
 Hakeem Seriki (born 1979), American rapper better known as Chamillionaire
 Hakim Toumi (born 1961), Algerian retired hammer thrower
 Hakim Abol Qasim Ferdowsi Tusi (940–1020), Persian poet and author of the epic Shahnameh better known as Ferdowsi
 Hakeem Valles, (born 1992), American football player
 Hakim Warrick (born 1982), American basketball player
 Hakim Ali Zardari (1930–2011), Pakistani tribal leader and father of former President Asif Ali Zardari
Hakim Ziyech (born 1993), Moroccan footballer

Family name
 Abdo Hakim (born 1973), Lebanese actor and voice actor
Ayala Hakim, director of the technology division of Mizrahi-Tefahot Bank, Israel, previously Brigadier-general of the Israeli Defence Forces
Az-Zahir Hakim (born 1977), American football coach and former player, older brother of Saalim Hakim
James Gita Hakim (1954-2021), Zimbabwean cardiologist and academic(1954
 Nasser Hakim (born 1960), Lebanese-born Curaçaoan businessman and politician
 André Hakim (1915–1980), Egyptian-born film producer for 20th Century Fox, brother of Robert and Raymond Hakim
 Imani Hakim, American actress
 Maximos II Hakim (c. 1689 – 1761), patriarch of the Melkite Greek Catholic Church from 1760 to 1761
 Maximos V Hakim (1908–2001), patriarch of the Melkite Greek Catholic Church from 1967 to 2000
 Nadey Hakim (born 1958), British surgeon
 Noel Hakim (born 1972), Franco-Lebanese Banker
 Naji Hakim (born 1955), the Lebanese-born  composer and organist at the Église de la Sainte-Trinité, Paris
 Omar Hakim (born 1959), American drummer
 Peter Hakim, American economist of Lebanese descent
 Robert and Raymond Hakim (1907–1992) and (1909–1980), Egyptian-born, European film producers, brothers of André Hakim
Saalim Hakim (born 1990), American football player, younger brother of Az-Zahir Hakim
Weli-Ahmed Hakim, Finnish Tatar Imam
 Yalda Hakim, Australian journalist
 Hakim family of Iraqi Shiite clerics:
 Muhsin al-Hakim (1889–1970), the spiritual leader of the Shia world between 1955 and 1970
 Muhammad Saeed al-Hakim (born 1936), Shiite cleric
 Mohammad Baqir al-Hakim (1939–2003), Shiite cleric
 Abdul Aziz al-Hakim (1953–2009), Shiite cleric and politician
 Ammar al-Hakim (born 1971), Shiite cleric and politician

Fictional characters
 Doctor Hakim, a character in the 2021 video game It Takes Two

See also

 Akim (disambiguation)
 Hakim (disambiguation)
 Al-Hakam (disambiguation)

Arabic masculine given names
Bosniak masculine given names
Pakistani masculine given names